Bob Gaddy (February 4, 1924 – July 24, 1997) was an American East Coast blues and rhythm-and-blues pianist, singer and songwriter. He is best remembered for his recordings of "Operator" and "Rip and Run," and musical work he undertook with Larry Dale, Wild Jimmy Spruill, Sonny Terry and Brownie McGhee.

Biography
Gaddy was born in Vivian, West Virginia, a small town based on coal mining. He learned to play the piano at an early age, playing and singing in his local church. In 1943, he was conscripted and served in the Navy, being stationed in California. He progressed from learning the blues and, using his gospel background, graduated towards the boogie-woogie playing style.

He played in blues clubs in Oakland and San Francisco, but after World War II ended he relocated to New York, in 1946. Gaddy later commented, "I came to New York just to visit, because I was on my way to the West Coast. Somehow or other, I just got hooked on it. New York got into my system and I've been stuck here ever since."

He found work as a blues pianist, and in the late 1940s, provided accompaniment to both Brownie McGhee and Sonny Terry. He later backed Larry Dale, and befriended Champion Jack Dupree. Dupree wrote "Operator" for Gaddy, one of his best-selling numbers. Gaddy first record for Jackson Records; his debut single, "Bicycle Boogie", was released in 1952. He later Recorded for the Jax, Dot and Harlem record labels, before joining Hy Weiss's Old Town Records in 1956. It was here that Gaddy had his most commercially successful period, particularly with "I Love My Baby", "Paper Lady", and "Rip and Run". For Gaddy's early recordings, McGhee was often in the recording studio with him; for his Old Town recordings, he used the guitarists Jimmy Spruill and Joe Ruffin and the saxophonist Jimmy Wright.

Gaddy stopped recording around 1960. However, along with his longtime friend Larry Dale, he remained a mainstay of the ongoing New York blues scene.

In April 1988, Gaddy, Dale and Spruill reunited to play at the Tramps nightclub in New York.

Gaddy died of lung cancer in July 1997, at the age of 73, in the Bronx, New York.

Discography

Singles
"I (Believe You Got a Sidekick)" / "Bicycle Boogie", Bob Gaddy & His Alley Cats (1952), Jackson Records
"No Help Wanted" / "Little Girl's Boogie", Bob Gaddy & His Alley Cats (1953), Jax Records
"Evil Man Blues" / "Doctor Gaddy's Blues", Doctor Gaddy & His Orchestra (1954), Dot Records
"Blues Has Walked in My Room" / "Slow Down Baby" (1955) - Harlem Records - 
"Operator" / "I Love My Baby", Doctor Gaddy & His Keys (1956), Old Town Records
"Paper Lady" / "Out of My Name", Doctor Gaddy & His Keys (1957), Old Town Records
"Woe Woe Is Me" / "Rip and Run", Doctor Gaddy & His Keys (1958), Old Town Records
"Take My Advice" / "You Are the One" (1959), Old Town Records
"Till the Day I Die"/ "I'll Go My Way" (1959), Old Town Records

Compilation albums
Rip and Run (1986), Ace
Bob Gaddy & Friends: Bicycle Boogie 1947–1960 (1987), Moonshine
Harlem Blues Operator (1995), Ace

See also

List of East Coast blues musicians

References

External links
 Illustrated Bob Gaddy discography

1924 births
1997 deaths
American blues pianists
American male pianists
Songwriters from West Virginia
American blues singers
American rhythm and blues musicians
Deaths from lung cancer in New York (state)
East Coast blues musicians
Singers from West Virginia
20th-century American singers
20th-century American pianists
20th-century American male singers
United States Navy personnel of World War II
African Americans in World War II
American male songwriters
People from McDowell County, West Virginia
African-American United States Navy personnel
20th-century African-American musicians